Valentine Wood Southall (c. 1793 – August 22, 1861) was a Virginia lawyer and politician. He represented Albemarle County in the Virginia House of Delegates, and served as that body's Speaker 1840–1842 and 1844–1845. Albemarle County voters also elected him to serve in the Virginia Secession Convention of 1861, where he voted with the majority, initially against secession but changing his vote to secede.

Early and family life
Born to planter Stephen Southall (1757 - ) and his second wife, Martha Wood Southall (1768 - ) in Amelia County, Virginia, Southall had a sister, Maria Wood Southall VanZandt (1782 - 1862) and elder half-brother, Dr. Philip Turner Southall (1791 - 1857), who inherited the family plantation.

Southall married twice, first on January 10, 1820 to Mary Anne Garrett Southall (1795 - b/f 1824), with whom he had a son William who died as an infant. He remarried in 1825 to Martha Cocke Southall (1799 - ). Three of their sons and two daughters survived the American Civil War:  William Henry Southall (1826 - 1890), James Cocke Southall (1828 - 1897), Stephen Valentine Southall (1830 - 1913), Lucy Smith Southall Sharp (1833 - 1914), Mary Southall Venable (1834 - 1920).

Career
Southall trained as a lawyer and was admitted to the [Albemarle County bar in 1813. A frequent guest of Thomas Jefferson at Monticello, he succeeded Thomas Jefferson Randolph in 1817 as collector of the federal direct tax and internal duties for Virginia's 19th Collection District. Southall became the first secretary for the Board of Visitors of Central College and during Lafayette's visit in November 1824, presided over a dinner held at the Rotunda of the University of Virginia. Albemarle County County voters elected him nine times to represent them in the Virginia House of Delegates, where he served in the sessions of 1833–34, 1835–36, 1839–42, 1840–42, 1844-1845 and 1843–46. Fellow delegates elected him as their Speaker during the 1840–42 and 1844–45 sessions.

During the Virginia Secession Convention of 1861, he and secessionist James P. Holcombe represented Albemarle County. Although initially voting against secession, Southall revised his opinion after the events at Fort Sumter and voted to secede.

Death and legacy
Southall died on August 22, 1861 and was buried beside his parents, siblings and wives at the Southall family cemetery in Amelia County. His namesake among his brother Philip's sons, Confederate Captain Valentine W. Southall (1839-1863), who commanded Company B of the 23rd Virginia Infantry, died at the Battle of Gettysburg. His name continues in use among family members. A distant relative, Valentine Southall Jr., is a Virginia lawyer and a juvenile and domestic relations judge in Amelia County.

References
List of former Speakers of the House of Delegates, in the old House chamber in the Virginia State Capitol

Specific

1780s births
1861 deaths
Members of the Virginia House of Delegates
Speakers of the Virginia House of Delegates
People from Albemarle County, Virginia
19th-century American politicians